Reference Re Assisted Human Reproduction Act is an appeal from the Quebec Court of Appeal to the Supreme Court of Canada on a reference question posed as to the constitutional validity of the Assisted Human Reproduction Act that had been passed by the Parliament of Canada.

Initial reference

The Court of Appeal was asked by the Government of Quebec to answer the following question:

The Court ruled in the affirmative in some respects of the question.

Appeal to the Supreme Court

The appeal was allowed in part, with the Court rendering a rare 4-4-1 mixed decision. The justices' opinions were as follows:

 = constitutionally valid
 = constitutional to the extent that they relate to constitutionally valid provisions
 = constitutionally invalid

The McLachlin opinion

The Act is essentially a series of prohibitions, followed by a set of subsidiary provisions for their administration.  While the Act will have beneficial effects and while some of its effects may impact on provincial matters, neither its dominant purpose nor its dominant effect is to set up a regime that regulates and promotes the benefits of artificial reproduction. Here, the matter of the statutory scheme, viewed as a whole, is a valid exercise of the federal power over criminal law.  The dominant purpose and effect of the legislative scheme is to prohibit practices that would undercut moral values, produce public health evils, and threaten the security of donors, donees, and persons conceived by assisted reproduction.

The LeBel/Deschamps opinion

The impugned provisions represent an overflow of the exercise of the federal criminal law power.  Their pith and substance is connected with the provinces’ exclusive jurisdiction over hospitals, property and civil rights, and matters of a merely local nature.  The impugned provisions affect rules with respect to the management of hospitals, since Parliament has provided that the Act applies to all premises in which controlled activities are undertaken. Furthermore, the fact that several of the impugned provisions concern subjects that are already governed by the Civil Code of Quebec and other Quebec legislation is an important indication that in pith and substance, the provisions lie at the very core of the provinces’ jurisdiction over civil rights and local matters.

The Cromwell opinion

The matter of the impugned provisions is regulation of virtually every aspect of research and clinical practice in relation to assisted human reproduction.  The matter of the challenged provisions is best classified as relating to the establishment, maintenance and management of hospitals, property and civil rights in the province and matters of a merely local or private nature in the province. However, ss. 8, 9 and 12 in purpose and effect prohibit negative practices associated with assisted reproduction and fall within the traditional ambit of the federal criminal law power.  Similarly, ss. 40(1), (6) and (7), 41 to 43, and 44(1) and (4) set up the mechanisms to implement s. 12 and, to the extent that they relate to provisions of the Act which are constitutional, were properly enacted by Parliament.  Sections 45 to 53, to the extent that they deal with inspection and enforcement in relation to constitutionally valid provisions of the Act, are also properly enacted under the criminal law power.  The same is true for ss. 60 and 61, which create offences.  Section 68 is also constitutional, although its operation will be limited to constitutional sections of the Act.  Given that the other provisions establishing the Assisted Human Reproduction Agency of Canada are not contested, there is no constitutional objection to s. 19.

Aftermath
The Act was rectified and the remainder brought into force in the following stages:

References

Supreme Court of Canada cases
Canadian federalism case law
Reproductive rights case law
2010 in Canadian case law
Supreme Court of Canada reference question cases